Martha Robinson Rivers Ingram (born August 20, 1935) is an American billionaire businesswoman and philanthropist. In 1995, Ingram succeeded her late husband as chairman and chief executive officer (CEO) of Ingram Industries, one of America's largest privately-held companies. She is the co-author of three books, including two biographies and a history of the performing arts in Nashville, Tennessee.

Early life
Martha Robinson Rivers was born in Charleston, South Carolina, the daughter of John Minott Rivers and Martha Elizabeth Robinson. She was educated at Ashley Hall in Charleston. She graduated from Vassar College with a Bachelor of Arts in history in 1957.

Career
Upon graduation, she found employment at WCSC-AM/FM and WCSC-TV, a radio and television station, respectively, owned by her father.

Ingram was appointed by her husband as director of public affairs at Ingram Industries in 1979. After her husband's death in 1995, she became chairman and CEO.

Ingram is the co-author of three books. Her first book was a biography of her husband published in 2001, six years after his death. In her second book, published in 2004, Ingram wrote about the performing arts scene in Nashville during the Antebellum era. She argued that it was destroyed by the American Civil War and that it never fully recovered. Her third book, published in 2006, was a biography of Kenneth Schermerhorn, the music director of the Nashville Symphony.

Philanthropy

Ingram was a co-founder of the Schermerhorn Symphony Center which opened in 2005. She formerly served as Chairman of the Board of Trust of Vanderbilt University in Nashville. The Vanderbilt Blair School of Music has been the recipient of $300 million of Ingram company stock.

Ingram was named in Business Week as the 50th most generous philanthropist, for her donations from 2000 to 2004. In 2006 she was honored by the Community Foundation of Middle Tennessee as the 2006 recipient of the 13th Annual Joe Kraft Humanitarian Award for her philanthropic efforts. She received the Eli & Edythe Broad Award for Philanthropy in the Arts.

Awards and honors
1999, South Carolina Business Hall of Fame
1999, Junior Achievement National Business Hall of Fame
2004, Golden Plate Award of the American Academy of Achievement presented by Awards Council member Naomi Judd
2017, Music City Walk of Fame

Personal life
On October 4, 1958, she married E. Bronson Ingram II (1931–1995) at St. Philip's Episcopal Church in Charleston, South Carolina. Her husband was the son of business magnate Orrin Henry Ingram, Sr., grandson of Erskine B. Ingram, and great-grandson of Orrin Henry Ingram. They had three sons and a daughter:

 Orrin H. Ingram II (born 1960), the CEO of Ingram Industries and the chairman of Ingram Barge Company.
 John R. Ingram (born ), the chairman of the Ingram Content Group, Lightning Source, and Ingram Industries.
 David Bronson Ingram (born ), the chairman and president of Ingram Entertainment.
 Robin Ingram Patton.

Political activity
In 2015, Ingram donated to Democratic candidate Megan Barry's campaign to become the new Mayor of Nashville.

Works

References

Living people
1935 births
Businesspeople from Charleston, South Carolina
People from Nashville, Tennessee
Vassar College alumni
Businesspeople from Tennessee
American women chief executives
American billionaires
Female billionaires
Vanderbilt University people
Philanthropists from Tennessee
American Episcopalians
Ingram family
Members of the Junior League